This List of Bengali poets includes poets who write in Bengali language who produce Bengali poetry. This list classifies poets into three  groups based on geographical location. These are poets from Bangladesh, poets from West Bengal of India and poets from other parts of the world including Bengali Diaspora and non-Bengali people writing poetry in Bengali. However, the list starts with early Bengali poets to be followed by those who are identified not only with Indian sub-continent before partition in 1947, but also as founders of Bengali poetry. The list also contains separate sub-lists of "rhyme composers" and "song writers". Finally, there are two sub-sets of woman poets and poets in exile.

Early poets

Siddhacharyas (6th to 12th CE) 
The poets of the Charyāpada (Bengali: চর্যাপদ), known as the Siddhacharyas, lived in eastern India and Nepal. The names of the Siddhacharyas in Sanskrit (or its Tibetan language equivalent), and the raga in which the verse was to be sung, are mentioned prior to each pada (verse). The surviving 50 manuscripts contains the name of 24 Siddhacharyas including Lui Pa, Kukkuri Pa, Birua Pa, Gundari Pa, Chatil Pa, Bhusuku Pa, Kanha Pa, Kambalambar Pa, Dombi Pa, Shanti Pa, Mahitta Pa, Bina Pa, Saraha Pa, Shabar Pa, Aryadeb Pa, Dhendhan Pa, Darik Pa, Bhade Pa, Tadak Pa, Kankan Pa, Ja’anandi Pa, Dham Pa, Tanti Pa and Loridombi Pa. Most of these names were pseudonyms as the poets rejected Vedic Hinduism and profess Sahajayana Buddhism. Lui Pa is considered as the earliest poet of Charyapadas. Kanha Pa's 11 poems survived which is the largest number among these poets.

The poets and their works as mentioned in the text are as follows:

Medieval Poets

Founders of modern Bengali poetry
 Amiya Chakravarty
 Bishnu Dey
 Sudhindranath Dutta
 Buddhadev Bose
 Sukanta Bhattacharya
 Ahsan Habib
 Farrukh Ahmad
 Syed Ali Ahsan
 Shamsur Rahman
 Al Mahmud
 Abul Hasan
 Quazi Johirul Islam
 Rudra Mohammad Shahidullah
 Girindramohini Dasi

Bengali poets from other parts of the world
 Abdul Gaffar Choudhury
 Shamim Azad
 Taslima Nasrin
 Abid Azad

Hungryalist poets
 Shakti Chattopadhyay
 Binoy Majumdar
 Samir Roychoudhury
 Malay Roy Choudhury
 Subimal Basak

Metrical poets
 Annada Shankar Ray
 Sukumar Ray
 Farrukh Ahmad
 Shamsur Rahman
 Motiur Rahman Mollik (1950–2010)
 Abu Zafar Obaidullah
 Rafiqul Haque
 Fayez Ahmed
 Ekhlasuddin Ahmed
 Abdur Rahman
 Nirmalendu Goon
 Asad Chowdhury
 Bimal Guha
 Shahabuddin Nagari

Song composers
 Lalon Shah
 Rabindranath Tagore
 Dwijendralal Ray
 Atulprasad Sen
 Rajanikanta Sen
 Kazi Nazrul Islam
 Hason Raja
 Kangal Harinath
 Shah Abdul Karim
 Abu Hena Mustafa Kamal
 Shahabuddin Nagari
 Motiur Rahman Mollik
 Rudra Mohammad Shahidullah
 Anjan Dutt
 Kabir Suman
 Nachiketa
 Gobinda Haldar

Poets of Kolkata
 Joy Goswami
 Sunil Gangopadhyaya
 Shakti Chattopadhyay
 Ekram Ali
 Subodh Sarkar
 Srijato

Poets of North Bengal 
Bikash Sarkar

Bibliography
 Biletey Bishsotoker Bangla Kobi, Rabbani Choudhury, Agamee Prakashani, Dhaka 2000
 Bangladesher Gronthoponji Boimela 2009, Rabbani Choudhury, Agamee Prakashani, Dhaka 2009
 Shanghati Tritio Banglar Lekok Porichithi Boimela 2009, Shanghati Literary Society, UK

See also 

 উইকিসংকলন:লেখক

References

+
Bengali